Blues for Coltrane: A Tribute to John Coltrane is a 1987 album by jazz pianist McCoy Tyner released on the Impulse! label. It features performances by Tyner, tenor saxophonists David Murray and Pharoah Sanders, bassist Cecil McBee and drummer Roy Haynes. The album received a Grammy Award for Best Jazz Instrumental Performance in 1988.

Track listing 
 "Bluesin' For John C." (Tyner)
 "Naima" (Coltrane)
 "The Promise" (Coltrane)
 "Lazy Bird" (Coltrane)
 "I Want to Talk About You" (Eckstine)
 "Last of the Hipmen" (Murray)
 "Trane" Bonus track on CD
 Recorded July 9, 1987

Personnel 
 McCoy Tyner – piano
 David Murray – tenor saxophone
 Pharoah Sanders – tenor saxophone
 Cecil McBee – bass
 Roy Haynes - drums

References 

McCoy Tyner albums
1988 albums
Impulse! Records albums
John Coltrane tribute albums
Grammy Award for Best Jazz Instrumental Album